is a Japanese professional footballer who plays as a midfielder for Tokyo Verdy Beleza of the WE League. She previously played for Reign FC and Montpellier.

A former Japanese international, Utsugi helped the team win the 2011 FIFA Women's World Cup.

Club career
Utsugi was born in Kawasaki on 5 December 1988. She began her professional career at Nippon TV Beleza in 2004. During her time at the club, she won four L.League titles and five Empress's Cups. In August 2010, after six years at Beleza, Utsugi departed her home country to sign for French club Montpellier of the Division 1 Féminine. After joining the club, she became the first Japanese player to play in the league.

International career
A left-footed defensive midfielder, Utsugi has represented Japan at the 2007, 2011, and 2015 editions of the World Cup, as well as two Asian Cup competitions. Japan won the 2011 World Cup. She was named in the World Cup 2015 All-Star squad.

Career statistics

Club

International

Scores and results list Japan's goal tally first, score column indicates score after each Utsugi goal.

Honours
Nippon TV Beleza
 L.League: 2005, 2006, 2007, 2008, 2010
 Empress's Cup: 2005, 2006, 2008, 2009
 Nadeshiko League Cup: 2007, 2010

Japan
 FIFA Women's World Cup: 2011; runners-up 2015
 AFC U-17 Women's Championship: 2005

See also
 List of FIFA Women's World Cup winning players
 List of women's footballers with 100 or more caps
 List of players who have appeared in multiple FIFA Women's World Cups
 List of Japan women's international footballers
 List of OL Reign players

References

External links

 
 
 
 
 UTSUGI Rumi|Players' Information – Japan Football Association
  
 
 Profile  at Montpellier HSC
 Player French football stats  at footofeminin.fr
 

1988 births
Living people
Association football people from Kanagawa Prefecture
Japanese women's footballers
Japan women's international footballers
Nadeshiko League players
National Women's Soccer League players
Nippon TV Tokyo Verdy Beleza players
Montpellier HSC (women) players
OL Reign players
Japanese expatriate footballers
Expatriate women's footballers in France
Japanese expatriate sportspeople in France
Expatriate women's soccer players in the United States
Japanese expatriate sportspeople in the United States
FIFA Women's World Cup-winning players
2007 FIFA Women's World Cup players
2011 FIFA Women's World Cup players
2015 FIFA Women's World Cup players
Olympic footballers of Japan
Footballers at the 2008 Summer Olympics
Women's association football midfielders
FIFA Century Club
Division 1 Féminine players
2019 FIFA Women's World Cup players